Here are several tables of National Hockey League team payrolls for each team in the NHL. For simplicity, players traded mid-season are considered to be on the payroll of the team acquiring that player.

League
After the 2004–05 season was cancelled, a new collective bargaining agreement (CBA) was agreed upon between the NHL and the NHL Players' Association. This CBA included a salary cap for team salaries (formally defined in the CBA as the "Upper Limit"), which would potentially increase from one season to the next depending on league revenues, and a cap for player salaries, set at 20 percent of the team salary cap. The teams also have a minimum payroll requirement (formally defined as the "Lower Limit"), which was $21.5 million in 2005–06, but fixed from 2006–07 onward at $16 million below the salary cap.

From the 2003–04 season to the 2005–06 season, the implementation of the salary cap caused a marked normalization of team payrolls, and a decrease in the payroll disparity from team to team. Ten teams (of thirty) decreased their payrolls by more than $15 million, with four decreasing their payrolls by more than $30 million; only seven teams increased their payrolls, with four increasing their payrolls by more than $5 million. The standard deviation of the payrolls decreased from $15,898,399 to $6,371,263 after the salary cap was introduced.

Between the 1998–99 and 2007–08 seasons, the total players' payroll was $9,990,698,194, which is an average of $37,700,748 per team per season. The division with the highest total payroll over this nine-year period is the Atlantic Division, paying out $1,912,252,452 ($42,494,499 per team per season). The division with the lowest total payroll over this period was the Southeast Division; it was considered the weakest hockey market in the league, as one of its teams (the Atlanta Thrashers) relocated prior to the 2011–12 season.

Teams in the Southeast Division have had a home attendance above the league average for a given year only six times:
 Carolina Hurricanes: 17,386 in 2006–07 (league average of 16,957); won the Stanley Cup that year
 Tampa Bay Lightning: 17,820 in 2003–04 (league avg. 16,533) – won the Stanley Cup that year
 20,509 in 2005–06 (league avg. 16,954) 
 19,876 in 2006–07 (league avg. 16,957)
 18,692 in 2007–08 (league avg. 17,308)
 Washington Capitals: 17,341 in 2001–02 (league avg. 16,759)

Prior to the dissolution of the Southeast Division after the 2012–13 season, teams in that division frequently had average attendance numbers in the bottom ten in the league for a given year:
 Atlanta Thrashers (have been in the bottom ten every year between 2000–01 and 2007–08; relocated to Winnipeg in 2011–12)
 Carolina Hurricanes (2000–01, 2001–02, 2003–04, and 2005–06)
 Florida Panthers (2000–01, 2006–07, and 2007–08)
 Tampa Bay Lightning (2000–01)
 Washington Capitals (2000–01, 2003–04, 2005–06, 2006–07, and 2007–08)</ref>—with total payrolls of $1,180,291,667 ($32,377,083 per team per season).

The team that spent the most on players' salaries over these nine seasons are the New York Rangers, who spent a total of $517,076,928 for players, averaging $57,452,992 per season. The Detroit Red Wings have the second highest total payroll over this period, with $483,801,165, for an average of $53,755,685 per season.

The Nashville Predators had the lowest payroll per season over the same period, totalling $218,136,880 ($24,237,431 per season), followed by the Atlanta Thrashers with a total of $212,616,075 ($26,577,009 per season). The absolute lowest payroll belongs to the Minnesota Wild, who joined the league in 2000–01. In the seven seasons since the Wild joined the league, they have the lowest total payroll, at $187,278,126 ($26,754,018 per season). Nashville's payroll over this period was slightly higher, at $187,936,880 ($26,848,126 per season).

The Calgary Flames held the unique distinction of being the only team to have increased their payroll every year between the 1998–99 season and the 2007–08 season.

Sergei Fedorov, Paul Kariya and Jaromir Jagr have each had the highest salary on three different teams between 2000–01 and 2007–08:
 Sergei Fedorov: Anaheim Ducks (2003–04), Columbus Blue Jackets (2005–06, 2006–07), Washington Capitals (2007–08)
 Paul Kariya: Anaheim Ducks (2000–01, 2001–02, 2002–03), Nashville Predators (2005–06), St. Louis Blues (2007–08)
 Jaromir Jagr: Pittsburgh Penguins (2000–01), Washington Capitals (2001–02, 2002–03, 2003–04), New York Rangers (2005–06, 2006–07)

Eastern Conference

Metropolitan Division
The Metropolitan Division currently has the highest total player payrolls of any division in the league as of the end of the 2018–19 season. Its predecessor division (which was known as the Atlantic Division between 1993 and 2013) had the highest total player payrolls of any division between 1998–99 and 2007–08, paying out $1,912,252,452 to its players ($42,494,499 per team per season). The New York Rangers were the highest paying team in the Atlantic Division (and in the entire league) over this period, with a player payroll of $517,076,928 ($57,452,992 per season), while the Pittsburgh Penguins are the lowest paying team in the division over these nine seasons, with total payrolls of $260,515,726 ($28,946,192 per season).

Carolina Hurricanes
These are the salaries for the Carolina Hurricanes.

Columbus Blue Jackets
These are the salaries for the Columbus Blue Jackets. The team played its first season in 2000–01 and was in the Western Conference between the 2000–01 season and the 2012–13 season.

New Jersey Devils
These are the salaries for the New Jersey Devils.

New York Islanders
These are the salaries for the New York Islanders.

New York Rangers
These are the salaries for the New York Rangers.

Philadelphia Flyers
These are the salaries for the Philadelphia Flyers.

Pittsburgh Penguins
These are the salaries for the Pittsburgh Penguins.

Washington Capitals
These are the salaries for the Washington Capitals.

Atlantic Division
The current incarnation of the Atlantic Division was created prior to the 2013–14 season as a merger between the Southeast Division and the Northeast Division. Between 1998–99 and 2007–08, the Northeast Division had total player payrolls of $1,694,667,213 ($37,659,271 per team per season). The Toronto Maple Leafs paid their players the most in the Northeast Division over these nine seasons, with total payrolls of $414,581,865 ($46,064,652 per season), while the Buffalo Sabres paid the least in the division over the same time, with total payrolls of $300,251,418 ($33,361,269 per season).

The other predecessor to the Atlantic Division, the Southeast Division, had the lowest player payroll of any division between 1998–99 and 2007–08, totalling $1,424,591,667 during this time ($32,377,083 per team per season). This market was considered one of the weakest in the league. The Washington Capitals were the highest paying team in the Southeast Division, with total payrolls of $343,231,500 ($38,136,833 per season); the Atlanta Thrashers, who joined the league in 1999–2000 and relocated to Winnipeg in 2011, were the lowest paying team in the division (and in the Eastern Conference), with total payrolls of $212,616,075 ($26,577,009 per season).

Boston Bruins
These are the salaries for the Boston Bruins.

Buffalo Sabres
These are the salaries for the Buffalo Sabres.

Detroit Red Wings
These are the salaries for the Detroit Red Wings.

Florida Panthers
These are the salaries for the Florida Panthers.

Montreal Canadiens
These are the salaries for the Montreal Canadiens.

Ottawa Senators
These are the salaries for the Ottawa Senators.

Tampa Bay Lightning
These are the salaries for the Tampa Bay Lightning.

Toronto Maple Leafs
These are the salaries for the Toronto Maple Leafs.

Western Conference

Central Division
The Central Division had player payrolls of $1,604,944,295 between 1998–99 and 2007–08 ($37,324,286 per team per season). The highest paying team in the Central Division (and in the Western Conference) during that period was the Detroit Red Wings (who transferred to the Atlantic Division in 2013), with total payrolls of $483,801,165 ($53,755,685 per season), while the lowest paying team in the division (and the entire league) was the Nashville Predators, with total payrolls of $218,136,880 ($24,237,431 per season).

Chicago Blackhawks
These are the salaries for the Chicago Blackhawks.

Colorado Avalanche
These are the salaries for the Colorado Avalanche.

Dallas Stars
These are the salaries for the Dallas Stars.

Minnesota Wild
These are the salaries for the Minnesota Wild. The team's first season was 2000–01.

Nashville Predators
These are the salaries for the Nashville Predators.

St. Louis Blues 
These are the salaries for the St. Louis Blues.

Winnipeg Jets
These are the salaries for the Winnipeg Jets. The team played its first season as the Atlanta Thrashers in 1999–2000, and moved to Winnipeg in 2011; they remained in the Southeast Division until the end of the 2012–13 season, when they were moved into the Central Division.

Pacific Division
The current iteration of the Pacific Division was created for the 2013–14 season; this division featured four teams from the old Pacific Division (three teams from California and one from Arizona) and the three Canadian teams that were present in the Northwest Division.

The Northwest Division paid out $1,544,681,647 to its players between 1998–99 and 2007–08 ($35,922,829 per team per season). The Colorado Avalanche had the highest player payrolls in the Northwest Division in this time, totalling $450,095,084 ($50,010,565 per season); the Minnesota Wild were the lowest paying team in the division (and in the league, for the seven years since they have been a part of it), with total payrolls of $187,278,126 ($26,754,018 per season).

The Pacific Division had payrolls of $1,809,560,920 ($40,212,465 per team per season) in the seasons between 1998–99 and 2007–08. The Dallas Stars paid the most in the Pacific Division over these nine seasons, with players receiving $452,957,886 ($50,328,654 per season), and the Phoenix Coyotes paid the least in the division over that time, with total payrolls of $303,728,146 ($33,747,572 per season); that team would file for bankruptcy in 2009 and was owned by the NHL until just before the 2013–14 season.

Anaheim Ducks
These are the salaries for the Anaheim Ducks.

Arizona Coyotes
These are the salaries for the Arizona Coyotes.

Calgary Flames
These are the salaries for the Calgary Flames. The Calgary Flames held the unique distinction of being the only team to have increased their payroll every year between the 1998–99 season and the 2007–08 season.

Edmonton Oilers
These are the salaries for the Edmonton Oilers.

Los Angeles Kings
These are the salaries for the Los Angeles Kings.

San Jose Sharks
These are the salaries for the San Jose Sharks.

Vancouver Canucks
These are the salaries for the Vancouver Canucks.

Vegas Golden Knights
These are the salaries for the Vegas Golden Knights, which began operations in the 2017–18 season.

See also

 List of player salaries in the NHL, for the top player salaries.
 Salary cap
 NHL Players' Association

Notes and references

References
 USA Today Salary Database — Source for 2000–01 through 2007–08
 HockeyZonePlus Salary Database — Source for 1998–99 and 1999–2000

Team payrolls
Team payrolls
NHL Team payrolls